Alternative spellings include Daiane, Dianne, Dianna, Dian, Diahann, Dyan, Dyanne and Dyane. See also Di and Diana

Notable people
 Diane, Duchess of Württemberg (born 1940), French-German painter, sculptor, writer, and philanthropist
 Diane Abbott (born 1953), British politician
 Diane Austin-Broos (born 1946), Australian anthropologist
 Diane Cummins (born 1974), Canadian middle-distance runner
Diane Damiano, American biomedical scientist and physical therapist
 Diane D'Aquila (born 1952), Canadian-American actress
 Diane Denoir (born 1957), Uruguayan singer
 Diane Duane (born 1952), American writer
 Diane Flacks, Canadian actress and writer
 Diane de France (1538–1619), daughter of Henry II of France
 Diane Franklin, American actress
 Diane Gerace (born 1943), Canadian high jumper, long jumper, and pentathlete
 Diane Guthrie-Gresham (born 1971), Jamaican long jumper and heptathlete
 Diane Henderson, American applied mathematician
 Diane Holl (born 1964), English motorsports engineer
 Diane Keaton (born 1946), American actress
 Diane Kruger (born 1976), German actress
 Diane Ladd (born 1935), American actress
 Diane Lambert, American statistician
 Diane Lane (born 1965), American actress
 Diane S. Littler, American phycologist
 Diane Maclagan (born 1974), mathematician
 Diane Mazloum (born 1980), French-Lebanese writer
 Diane Modahl (born 1966), English middle-distance runner
 Diane Murphy (born 1964), American actress
 Diane Neal (born 1975), American actress
 Diane Nelson (born 1958), Canadian curler
 Diane Nelson (comics) (born 1968), American business executive
 Diane Obomsawin (born 1959), Canadian author, illustrator and animated filmmaker
 Diane Pappas (born 1970/1971), Democratic member of the Illinois House of Representatives 
 Diane de Poitiers (1500–1566), French noblewoman
 Diane Rakiecki (born 1961), Canadian multi-sport para-athlete
 Diane Ratnik (born 1962), Canadian volleyball player
 Diane Sawyer (born 1945), American television journalist
 Diane Tell (born 1959), Canadian musician
 Diane Warren (born 1956), American songwriter
 Diane von Furstenberg (born 1946), Belgian fashion designer
 Diane Youdale (born 1970), English television personality

 Other
 Diahann Carroll (1935–2019), American actress and singer
 Dian Fossey (1932–1985), American primatologist and conservationist
 Dianne Nelson (born 1954), American short-story writer
 Dyan Cannon (born 1937), American actress

Fictional characters

 Diane Court, a fictional character in the 1989 Cameron Crowe film Say Anything..., played by Ione Skye
 Diane Chambers, a fictional character in the TV series Cheers
 Diane Darcy, a fictional race car driver in Herbie Goes to Monte Carlo
 Diane, an unseen character from the 2008 video game No More Heroes
 Diane, an unseen and unheard character in the television show Twin Peaks
 Diane Jenkins Newman, a character on the American soap opera The Young and the Restless
 Diane Sugden, a character on the British soap opera Emmerdale
 Diane Nguyen, a fictional character on the American adult animated series Bojack Horseman, voiced by Alison Brie
 Pinkamena Diane Pie, full name of Pinkie Pie, a character in My Little Pony: Friendship is Magic

Circassian feminine given names
English feminine given names
English-language feminine given names
French feminine given names